Joseph Oscar "Ozzieie" Aubuchon (January 2, 1917 – September 10, 1970) was a Canadian professional ice hockey left winger who played 50 games with the Boston Bruins and New York Rangers over two National Hockey League seasons from 1942 to 1944. The rest of his career, which lasted from 1936 to 1947, saw him play mainly in the minor American Hockey League, though he also spent two seasons in the English National League during the 1930s. He was born in Saint-Hyacinthe, Quebec.

Playing career
Aubuchon began his career with the Montreal Jr. Canadiens in 1934 before moving to Britain. He returned to North America in 1939 and was signed by the Bruins for the 1942–43 NHL season, yet spent most of the season with Providence of the AHL. Nine games into the following season he was traded to the Rangers as a war replacement (had received a medical discharge). He would go on to play with other minor pro teams, as well as the Quebec Senior Hockey League.

Oscar Aubuchon also coached the Drummondville Eagles and they won the Allan Cup in 1967.  After his playing days he coached many years for amateur hockey teams in Quebec.

Career statistics

Regular season and playoffs

References

External links

1917 births
1970 deaths
Boston Bruins players
Brighton Tigers players
Buffalo Bisons (AHL) players
Canadian expatriates in the United States
Canadian ice hockey left wingers
Cleveland Barons (1937–1973) players
Hershey Bears players
Ice hockey people from Quebec
New Haven Eagles players
New York Rangers players
Pittsburgh Hornets players
Providence Reds players
St. Louis Flyers players
Sportspeople from Saint-Hyacinthe